Hamu is a surname and given name. Notable people with the name include:

 Ana Hamu (died 1848), Māori woman
 Bruna Hamú (born 1990), Brazilian actress and model
 Hamu Kayondo (born 1990), Ugandan cricket player
 Hamu Shiru (died 1932), Yezidi tribal leader